John Zouche may refer to:

John Zouche (died 1445), MP for Nottinghamshire (UK Parliament constituency)
John Zouche (died 1585), MP for Hindon and Shaftesbury
John Zouche (died 1586), MP for Derbyshire (UK Parliament constituency)

See also
John la Zouche, 7th Baron Zouche, 8th Baron St Maur (1459–1526), Yorkist nobleman